The Avondale Elementary School District was established in 1894. Located west of Phoenix, Arizona, the district is home to nine schools ranging from kindergarten through eighth grade with several magnet programs. Avondale schools have been recognized at the national and state level for their passion and commitment for educational excellence, having obtained numerous A ratings.

List of schools in the district: 
 Avondale Middle School 
 Centerra Mirage STEM Academy 
 Copper Trails School 
 Desert Star School 
 Desert Thunder School 
 Eliseo C. Felix School 
 Lattie Coor School 
 Michael Anderson School 
 Wildflower Accelerated Academy

Avondale School District 44 is a school district in Avondale, Arizona. Schools are located in the cities of Goodyear and Avondale.

External links
 

School districts in Maricopa County, Arizona
1894 establishments in Arizona Territory
School districts established in 1894